Padmapur is a village in the Rayagada district of Odisha, India. It is the most populated village and one of the identified tourist centers of the district. A hillock adjoins the village to its northern side to enhance the scenic beauty of the place. A 7th century inscription found here, in the Nilakantheswar Temple (a religious place i.e. the shrine of Lord Manikeswar Shiva), indicates that the Jagamanda hill, located close by, once housed the monastery of the famous Buddhist logician-philosopher Dharmakirti.

Demography 
Padmapur is a populated village in Rayagada district situated about 67 km away from the district headquarters.  India census, Padmapur village had a population of 6530.The total population of the village as per the 2011 Census of India was 6654 out of which the male population is 3411 and the female population is 3243.

The postal Index Number (PIN) of padmapur is 765025.

Geography 
It has a mixed climate of mountain and coastal plain.

Transport 
There is no direct rail or air  communication to Padmapur. The nearest airport is in Visakhapatnam (240 km) and the nearest railway station is in Gunupur. One can reach Padmapur via Rayagada by Odisha State Road Transport Corporation buses or private buses.

Temples 

A number of old and new temples in and around Padmapur, as detailed below, attract the nearby mass during festive seasons.

 The seventh century-old Nilakantheswar temple at Padmapur (a shrine to Shiva) on the top of the hillock adjoining the village. This temple is also believed to be the Mallikeshwara temple
 The temple of Mallikeswar at the foot of the hillock, which is built of red rocks
 The temple of Dhabaleswar beside the temple of Mallikeswar
 Another temple of Pudukeswar close to these temples at the foot of the hillock,
 The Radhakrushna temple in New Street
 The Giridhari temple in the Badasahi
 The Gopinatha temple or Dasima Matha
 The Trinath temple beside the road leading to Gunupur
 The Gramadevati temple at the heart of the village
 The Gayatri temple on the hillock area
 The temple of Hanumana and the temple of Sai Baba on the hillock
 Another small temple of Trinath  at Jhumuruguda beside the main road

Education 

Padmapur has a number of educational institutions. Some of them are:
 The Govt. Bijayananda High School
 The Govt. Boys' Upper Primary School near Markama street
 The Primary school at Medical Colony in the village
 The Primary School at Hatapada in the village
 The Girls' High School
 The R.G.(Junior) College
 Triveni +2 Science College
 The Ideal Public School
 The Aryan English Medium School at Padmapur
 The Gajanana Vidya Niketana (Odia medium)
 The Saraswati Sishu Mandir (Odia medium)

Notable people 
 Nagbhushan Patnaik, a Communist leader, was born at Padmapur in 1934

References

External links 
Official website of Rayagada district

Villages in Rayagada district